Gerard Veldscholten (born 19 August 1959 in Lemselo, Overijssel) is a Dutch former professional road bicycle racer. In 1985 he placed 2nd in the Dutch National Championship and also performed well in the 1985 UCI Road World Championships finishing within the group just three seconds behind winner Joop Zoetemelk. In 1988 he finished 7th in Paris–Roubaix and won the Tour de Romandie.

Major results

 1980
 1st Stage 3 Tour de Namur
 1982
 1st Stage 9a (TTT) Tour de France
 1983
 1st Profronde van Almelo
 1st Stage 1 Tour de Romandie
 1984
 1st Stage 1a Critérium du Dauphiné Libéré
 1st Gouden Pijl Emmen
 1st GP Union Dortmund
 1st Stage 3 Tour de Suisse
 1985
 1st Hengelo
 1st Meerssen
 2nd Road race, National Road Championships
 1988
 1st  Overall Tour de Romandie
 1st Hansweert
 1991
 1st Profronde van Almelo
 1st Stage 3 Ronde van Nederland

References

External links 

1959 births
Living people
People from Weerselo
Dutch male cyclists
Tour de Suisse stage winners
Cyclists from Overijssel